The 1994–95 La Liga season, the 64th since its establishment, started on September 3, 1994, and finished on June 18, 1995.

Team information

Clubs and locations

League table

Results

Relegation play-offs

First leg

Second leg

Pichichi Trophy

Signings 
 Players on loan are marked on italics
 Source: http://www.bdfutbol.com/

References 

La Liga seasons
1994–95 in Spanish football leagues
Spain